Virola sebifera is a species of tree in the family Myristicaceae, from North and South America.

Description 
The small flowers are single-sexed and are found in panicles. The individual Virola trees, which include 40 to 60 species, are difficult to differentiate from one another.

Vernacular names 
English: red ucuuba.

Portuguese: Ucuúba-do-cerrado.

Chemical constituents 
The bark of the tree is rich in tannins and also the hallucinogen dimethyltryptamine (DMT), as well as 5-MeO-DMT. The ripe seeds contain fatty acid glycerides, especially laurodimyristin and trimyristin.  The bark contains 0.065% to 0.25% alkaloids, most of which are DMT and 5-MeO-DMT.  The "juice or gum" of the bark seems to have the highest concentrations of alkaloids (up to 8%).

Uses

Industrial uses 
Seeds from V. sebifera are processed to obtain the fats, which are yellow and aromatic.  They smell like nutmeg.  The fats also become rancid quickly.  They are used industrially in the production of fats, candles, and soaps.  This virola fat possesses properties similar to cocoa butter and shea butter.

Traditional medicine 
The smoke of the inner bark of the tree is used by shamans of the indigenous people of Venezuela in cases of fever conditions, or cooked for driving out evil ghosts.

Myristica sebifera (abbreviation: Myris) is derived from the fresh, red juice from the injured bark of the tree.  It is especially used for such ailments as abscesses,  phlegmon, paronychia, furuncle, anal fissures, infections of the parotid gland, bacterially infected tonsilitis, and others.

References

Further reading 
 Christian Rätsch: Enzyklopädie der psychoaktiven Pflanzen. AT Verlag, 2007, 8.te Auflage, 
 Karl Hiller, Matthias F. Melzig, Lexikon der Arzneipflanzen und Drogen, 2 Bände, Genehmigte Sonderausgabe für den area verlag, 2006, 
 Markus Wiesenauer, Suzann Kirschner-Brouns: Homöopathie - Das große Handbuch, Gräfe & Unzer Verlag, 2007,

External links 
 Virola sebifera - Photo Gallery
 Photos of Virola sebifera
 Three photos of Talgmuskatnußbaum
 Virola sebifera Aublet
 Climate Change and the effects on Virola sebifera

sebifera
Flora of Central America
Flora of South America
Flora of the Cerrado
Flora of Costa Rica
Flora of Panama
Flora of Colombia
Flora of Brazil
Medicinal plants of Central America
Medicinal plants of South America